The 2008 United States presidential election in Idaho took place on November 4, 2008, and was part of the 2008 United States presidential election. Voters chose four representatives, or electors to the Electoral College, who voted for president and vice president.

Idaho was won by Republican nominee John McCain by a 25.3% margin of victory. Prior to the election, all 17 major news organizations considered this a state McCain would win, or a red state. Polling in the state gave a sizable lead to McCain over Democrat Barack Obama, with most polling predicting a McCain win of at least 30 percentage points. Despite his landslide defeat in the state, Obama over-performed his polls and greatly improved on Kerry's performance four years earlier. Idaho has not gone Democratic since Lyndon B. Johnson narrowly won it in 1964.

Primaries
 2008 Idaho Democratic presidential caucuses
 2008 Idaho Republican presidential primary

Campaign

Predictions
There were 16 news organizations who made state-by-state predictions of the election. Here are their last predictions before election day:

Polling

McCain won every pre-election poll with a double-digit margin and with at least 52 percent of the vote. The final three poll average gave the Republican 66 percent to Obama's 29 percent.

Fundraising
Obama raised $874,523. McCain raised $441,338.

Advertising and visits
Obama spent $268. McCain spent $434. Neither campaign visited the state.

Analysis
With a substantial Mormon population, Idaho is one of the most reliably GOP bastions in the country. Although Barack Obama became the first Democratic presidential candidate since Michael Dukakis in 1988 to eclipse 35 percent of the vote in solidly red state Idaho, the state was still won handily by John McCain by a margin of approximately 25.34 percent. McCain carried 41 of the state's 44 counties, with Obama winning Blaine County, home to Sun Valley and several other prime ski resorts; Latah County, home to the college town of Moscow, and Teton County, a highly affluent suburb of Teton County, Wyoming, and the last until Joe Biden won it in 2020 United States presidential election in Idaho. Obama was the first Democrat to carry Teton County since Harry S. Truman in 1948. He also narrowed the Republican margins of victory in Ada County, and in the state capital and city of Boise to single digits. McCain's victory in Idaho, however, was less than that of George W. Bush who carried the state with 68.38 percent of the vote in 2004, a 12.78-point swing to the Democrats in Idaho.

With 61.21 percent of the popular vote, Idaho proved to be McCain's fourth strongest state in 2008 election after Oklahoma, Wyoming and Utah.

During the same election, Republicans held onto the open U.S. Senate seat vacated by Republican Larry Craig who reluctantly retired after it was revealed that he had solicited a man for sex in the men's restroom at an airport in Minneapolis. Former Lieutenant Governor Jim Risch, a Republican, was elected with 57.65% of the vote over Democrat Larry LaRocco who received 34.11%. A pro-life independent candidate received 5.35 point while Libertarian Kent Marmon received 1.54% and Rex Rammell, a far right-wing candidate who also ran as an Independent, received 1.34%.

At the state level, Republicans expanded their supermajority status in the Idaho state legislature as they picked up one seat in the Idaho House of Representatives.

Results

Results by county

Counties that flipped from Republican to Democratic
 Latah (largest city: Moscow)
 Teton (largest city: Victor)

By congressional district
John McCain solidly swept both Idaho's congressional districts, including that elected a Democrat.

Electors

Technically the voters of Idaho cast their ballots for electors: representatives to the Electoral College. Idaho is allocated four electors because it has two congressional districts and two senators. All candidates who appear on the ballot or qualify to receive write-in votes must submit a list of four electors, who pledge to vote for their candidate and his or her running mate. Whoever wins a plurality of votes in the state is awarded all four electoral votes. Their chosen electors then vote for president and vice president. Although electors are pledged to their candidate and running mate, they are not obligated to vote for them. An elector who votes for someone other than his or her candidate is known as a faithless elector.

The electors of each state and the District of Columbia met on December 15, 2008, to cast their votes for president and vice president. The Electoral College itself never meets as one body. Instead the electors from each state and the District of Columbia met in their respective capitols.

The following were the members of the Electoral College from the state. All four were pledged to John McCain and Sarah Palin:
Darlene Bramon
Ben Doty
John Erickson
Melinda Smyser

See also
 United States presidential elections in Idaho
 Presidency of Barack Obama

Notes

References

Idaho
2008 Idaho elections
2008